Pethalur  is a village in the Gadag district of Karnataka State in India.

Pethalur irrigation project
Pethalur is famous for the Pethalur Irrigation Project located near to the village.

See also
 Lakkundi
 Dambal
 Hombal
 Harti (Gadag district) 
 Gadag

References

Villages in Gadag district